Puravrutham is a 1988 Indian Malayalam film, directed by Lenin Rajendran and produced by M. K. Aniyan. The film stars Revathy, Om Puri, Innocent and KPAC Lalitha in the lead roles. The film has musical score by Kavalam Narayana Panicker.

Cast
 
Revathy as Devu
Om Puri as Raman
Innocent as Kelu Vair
KPAC Lalitha as Kanaran's Wife
Murali as Achu
Abu Salim 
Babu Namboothiri as Masur
Balan K. Nair as Kanaran
Jagannathan as Toddy Shop Keeper
M. S. Thripunithura as Landlord
R. K. Nair 
Thodupuzha Vasanthi 
Sujatha Thiruvananthapuram as Pathu
Vijayaraghavan as Abu
Sreedharan mash as Police Man

Soundtrack
The music was composed by Kavalam Narayana Panicker.

References

External links
 

1988 films
1980s Malayalam-language films
Films directed by Lenin Rajendran